The Batman/Tarzan Adventure Hour is a Filmation series that ran on CBS during the 1977–1978 television season. It consisted of the second season of Tarzan, Lord of the Jungle (six new episodes combined with reruns from the first season), and reruns of The New Adventures of Batman aired together.

For the 1978–1980 seasons, the series was re-titled Tarzan and the Super 7 and expanded to ninety-minutes with additional content. For the 1980–1982 seasons, reruns of the Batman and the Super 7 episodes moved to NBC and Tarzan joined The Tarzan/Lone Ranger Adventure Hour.

Voice cast

Tarzan, Lord of the Jungle (1977)

 Robert Ridgely as Tarzan

The New Adventures of Batman (1977)

 Adam West as Batman / Bruce Wayne
 Burt Ward as Robin / Dick Grayson
 Melendy Britt as Batgirl / Barbara Gordon, Catwoman / Selina Kyle
 Lou Scheimer as Bat-Mite, Batcomputer
 Lennie Weinrib as Commissioner Gordon, Joker, Penguin, Mr. Freeze, Electro, Chameleon, Zarbor, Clayface (2nd Time), Moonman / Scott Rogers, Professor Bubbles, Sweet Tooth

References

External links
 
 

CBS original programming
NBC original programming
1970s American animated television series
1977 American television series debuts
1978 American television series endings
Animated television shows based on DC Comics
Animated Tarzan television series
Batman television series by Filmation
Television series by Warner Bros. Television Studios
American children's animated adventure television series
American children's animated superhero television series